Events from the year 1969 in Michigan.

The Associated Press (AP) and United Press International (UPI) each selected the top 10 stories in Michigan for 1969, including the following:
 The "Michigan murders", a series of six killings of young women between 1967 and 1969 in the Ann Arbor/Ypsilanti area climaxing with the August 1 arrest of John Norman Collins (AP-1, UPI-1);
 An education reform plan proposed by Governor William Milliken (AP-2, UPI-2);
 The debate over a proposal to provide public funding to parochial schools (AP-3, UPI-2);
 William Milliken's succession of George W. Romney as Governor of Michigan following Romney's becoming United States Secretary of Housing and Urban Development (AP-4, UPI-3);
 The New Bethel Church shootout between members of the Republic of New Africa and the Detroit Police Department on March 29 (AP-5, UPI-7);
 The November 4 Detroit mayoral election in which Wayne County Sheriff Roman Gribbs narrowly defeated Wayne County auditor Richard H. Austin's bid to become the city's first African-American mayor (AP-6, UPI-6);
 Henry Ford II's firing of Semon Knudsen as president of Ford Motor Company on September 11, only 18 months after Knudsen was hired away from General Motors (AP-7, UPI-5);
 The October 17 appointment of Clifton R. Wharton Jr. as President of Michigan State University, the first African-American to head a major university (AP-8, UPI-8);
 Controversy over sex education guidelines prepared by the Michigan Board of Education (UPI-4);
 The murder trial and acquittal of Detroit police officer Ronald August arising out of the Algiers Motel incident (AP-9);
 The emergence of Robert P. Griffin as a force in the United States Senate with his selection as whip (UPI-9); 
 The death of Dr. Leroy G. Augenstein, a member of the Michigan State Board of Education and a potential U.S. Senate candidate in 1970, in a private plane crash on November 8 (AP-10, UPI-10).

The UPI also selected the state's top 10 sports stories as follows:
 The 1969 Ohio State vs. Michigan football game with Michigan upsetting undefeated and No. 1 ranked Ohio State on November 22;
 The 1969 Michigan Wolverines football team tying for the Big Ten Conference championship and receiving the conference's berth to play in the 1970 Rose Bowl;
 Spencer Haywood, basketball player at the University of Detroit, selected as an All-American and decided to turn pro;
 The October 16 firing of Bill Gadsby as the Detroit Red Wings's coach with Sid Abel taking over coaching duties;
 The August 10 firing of Johnny Sain as the Detroit Tigers' pitching coach after a public rift with manager Mayo Smith;
 The first and last Michigan Golf Classic, held at the Shenandoah Golf and County Club, which became the first PGA Tour event in modern history to default on its obligation to pay purse money;
 The 1969 Detroit Lions finishing with their best record since 1962;
 Gordie Howe tallying a career-high 103 points at age 41;
 The 1969 Detroit Tigers failing to repeat as American League champions and finishing in second place in the new American League East;
 (tie) The September 10 death of Michigan State basketball coach John E. Benington from a heart attack in the coaches' locker room at Jenison Fieldhouse, and Dave Bing's September 2 announcement that he would leave the Detroit Pistons in 1971 to play for the Washington Capitols in the ABA.

In music, the year's highlights in Michigan included albums from Michigan bands Tommy James and the Shondells (featuring "Crimson and Clover" and "Crystal Blue Persuasion"), The Stooges (featuring "I Wanna Be Your Dog"), Bob Seger (featuring "Ramblin' Gamblin' Man"), the MC5 (Kick Out the Jams), Alice Cooper, and Grand Funk Railroad, and Motown's Hitsville U.S.A. continued to produce hit records by The Temptations ("I Can't Get Next to You"), Diana Ross & the Supremes ("Someday We'll Be Together"), Stevie Wonder ("My Cherie Amour"), The Jackson 5 ("I Want You Back"), and Marvin Gaye ("Too Busy Thinking About My Baby").

Office holders

State office holders
 Governor of Michigan: George W. Romney (Republican) (until January22)/William Milliken (Republican) (starting January 22)
 Lieutenant Governor of Michigan: William Milliken (Republican) (until January 22)/Thomas F. Schweigert (acting, Republican)
 Michigan Attorney General: Frank J. Kelley (Democrat)
 Michigan Secretary of State: James M. Hare (Democrat)
 Speaker of the Michigan House of Representatives: William A. Ryan (Democrat)
 Majority Leader of the Michigan Senate: Emil Lockwood (Republican)
 Chief Justice, Michigan Supreme Court: Thomas E. Brennan

Mayors of major cities

 Mayor of Detroit: Jerome Cavanagh
 Mayor of Grand Rapids: C. H. Sonneveldt
 Mayor of Flint: Floyd J. McCree/Donald R. Cronin
 Mayor of Saginaw: Henry G. Marsh/Warren C. Light
 Mayor of Dearborn: Orville L. Hubbard
 Mayor of Lansing: Max E. Murninghan/Gerald W. Graves
 Mayor of Ann Arbor: Wendell Hulcher (Republican) / Robert J. Harris (Democrat)

Federal office holders

 U.S. Senator from Michigan: Robert P. Griffin (Republican)
 U.S. Senator from Michigan: Philip Hart (Democrat) 
 House District 1: John Conyers (Democrat)
 House District 2: Marvin L. Esch (Republican)
 House District 3: Garry E. Brown (Republican)
 House District 4: J. Edward Hutchinson (Republican)
 House District 5: Gerald Ford (Republican)
 House District 6: Charles E. Chamberlain (Republican)
 House District 7: Donald W. Riegle Jr. (Republican)
 House District 8: R. James Harvey (Republican)
 House District 9: Guy Vander Jagt (Republican)
 House District 10: Elford Albin Cederberg (Republican)
 House District 11: Philip Ruppe (Republican)
 House District 12: James G. O'Hara (Democrat)
 House District 13: Charles Diggs (Democrat)
 House District 14: Lucien N. Nedzi (Democrat)
 House District 15: William D. Ford (Democrat)
 House District 16: John Dingell Jr. (Democrat)
 House District 17: Martha Griffiths (Democrat)
 House District 18: William Broomfield (Republican)
 House District 19: Jack H. McDonald (Republican)

Population

Sports

Baseball
 1969 Detroit Tigers season – Under manager Mayo Smith, the Tigers compiled a 90–72 record and finished second in the American League East. The team's statistical leaders included Jim Northrup with a .295 batting average, Willie Horton with 28 home runs and 98 RBIs, Denny McLain with 24 wins, and Tom Timmermann with a 2.75 earned run average.
 1969 Michigan Wolverines baseball team - Under head coach Moby Benedict, the Wolverines compiled a 14–21–1 record and finished third in the Big Ten Conference.

American football
 1969 Detroit Lions season – The Lions, under head coach Joe Schmidt, compiled a 9–4–1 record and finished in second place in the NFL's Central Division. The team's statistical leaders included Bill Munson with 1,062 passing yards, Bill Triplett with 377 rushing yards, Charlie Sanders with 656 receiving yards, and Errol Mann with 101 points scored.
 1969 Michigan Wolverines football team – Under head coach Bo Schembechler, the Wolverines compiled an 8–3 record and were ranked No. 9 in the final AP Poll. The team's statistical leaders included Don Moorhead with 1,261 passing yards, Billy Taylor with 864 rushing yards and 114 points scored, Jim Mandich with 662 receiving yards, and Garvie Craw with 78 points scored. 
 1969 Michigan State Spartans football team – Under head coach Duffy Daugherty, the Spartans compiled a 4–6 record. The team's statistical leaders included Bill Triplett with 715 passing yards, Don Highsmith with 937 rushing yards and 42 points scored, and Frank Foreman with 537 receiving yards. 
 1969 Central Michigan Chippewas football team – Under head coach Roy Kramer, the Chippewas compiled a 7–3 record. 
 1969 Eastern Michigan Hurons football team – Under head coach Dan Boisture, the Hurons compiled a 5–4 record.
 1969 Western Michigan Broncos football team – Under head coach Bill Doolittle, the Broncos compiled a 4–6 record.

Basketball
 1968–69 Detroit Pistons season – Under head coach Donnie Butcher, the Pistons compiled a 32–50 record. The team's statistical leaders included Dave Bing with 1,800 points and 546 assists and Happy Hairston with 959 rebounds.
 1968–69 Michigan Wolverines men's basketball team – Under head coach Johnny Orr, the Wolverines compiled a 13–11 record. Rudy Tomjanovich led the team with 617 points and 340 rebounds.
 1968–69 Detroit Titans men's basketball team – The Titans compiled a 16–10 record under head coach Bob Calihan. Spencer Haywood led the team with 771 points (32.1 points per game) and 530 rebounds.
 1968–69 Michigan State Spartans men's basketball team – Under head coach John E. Benington, the Spartans compiled an 11–12 record.
 1968–69 Western Michigan Broncos men's basketball team – Under head coach Clarence Sonny Means, the Broncos compiled an 11–13 record.

Ice hockey
 1968–69 Detroit Red Wings season – Under head coach Bill Gadsby, the Red Wings compiled a 33–31–12 record and finished fifth in the National Hockey League's East Division. The team's statistical leaders included Frank Mahovlich with 49 goals and Gordie Howe with 59 assists and 103 points. The team's regular goaltenders were Roy Edwards and Roger Crozier.
 1968–69 Michigan Tech Huskies men's ice hockey team – Under head coach John MacInnes, Michigan Tech compiled a 21–9–2 record and finished fourth at the 1969 NCAA Division I Men's Ice Hockey Tournament.
 1968–69 Michigan Wolverines men's ice hockey season – Under head coach Al Renfrew, the Wolverines compiled a 16–12 record. 
 1968–69 Michigan State Spartans men's ice hockey team – Under head coach Amo Bessone, the Spartans compiled an 11–16–1 record.

Golf

 Buick Open – Dave Hill won the event.
 Michigan Open – Charles Knowles won the event.

Boat racing
 Port Huron to Mackinac Boat Race – 
 Spirit of Detroit race –
 APBA Gold Cup –

Other
 1969 NCAA Indoor Track and Field Championships – The fourth annual NCAA indoor championships were held at Cobo Arena in Detroit in March; Kansas won the team championship.
 1969 Motor State 500 - Cale Yarborough was the winner of the race, part of the NASCAR Grand National Series, held on June 15 at the Michigan International Speedway in Brooklyn, Michigan.
 Yankee 600 - David Pearson was the winner of the race, also part of the NASCAR Grand National Series, held on August 17 at the Michigan International Speedway.

Music
Michigan and/or Motown acts performed 14 of the songs ranked on the Billboard Year-End Hot 100 singles of 1969, as follows:
 "I Can't Get Next to You" by The Temptations (No. 3);
 "Crimson and Clover" by Tommy James and the Shondells (No. 10);
 "Crystal Blue Persuasion" by Tommy James and the Shondells (No. 12);
 "Too Busy Thinking About My Baby" by Marvin Gaye (No. 14);
 "What Does It Take (To Win Your Love)" by Junior Walker (No. 20);
 "My Cherie Amour" by Stevie Wonder (No. 32);
 "Baby, Baby Don't Cry" by The Miracles (No. 37);
 "Runaway Child, Running Wild" by The Temptations (No. 57);
 "Twenty-Five Miles" by Edwin Starr (No. 69);
 "That's the Way Love Is" by Marvin Gaye (No. 72);
 "Ramblin' Gamblin' Man" by The Bob Seger System (No. 86);
 "I'm Gonna Make You Love Me" by Diana Ross & the Supremes and The Temptations (No. 87);
 "I Heard It Through the Grapevine" by Mavin Gaye (No. 88); and
 "My Whole World Ended (The Moment You Left Me)" by David Ruffin (No. 97).

Albums released by Michigan and/or Motown acts in 1969 included the following:
 Crimson & Clover by Tommy James and the Shondells was released in January and reached No. 8 on the Billboard album chart. It featured the hit songs, "Crimson and Clover" (pop No. 1) and "Crystal Blue Persuasion" (pop No. 2).
 Ramblin' Gamblin' Man by The Bob Seger System was released in January. The single of the same title reached No. 17 on the Billboard Hot 100.
 Cloud Nine by The Temptations was released on February 17 and reached No. 4 on the Billboard album chart. It featured the hit songs, "Cloud Nine" (No. 2 R&B, No. 6 pop) and "Runaway Child, Running Wild" (No. 1 R&B, No. 6 pop).
 Kick Out the Jams by the MC5 was released in February. It was recorded live at Detroit's Grande Ballroom on October 30–31, 1968. The album was ranked No. 294 on Rolling Stone list of the "500 Greatest Albums of All Time".
 M.P.G. by Marvin Gaye was released on April 30 and reached No. 1 on the soul albums chart. It was recorded at the Hitsville U.S.A. studio in Detroit. It featured the hit songs, "Too Busy Thinking About My Baby" (R&B No. 1, pop No. 4) and "That's The Way Love Is" (No. 2 soul, No. 7 pop).
 Let the Sunshine In by Diana Ross & the Supremes was released on May 26 and reached No. 7 on the R&B albums chart. It featured the hit single, "I'm Livin' in Shame" (No. 10 pop).
 Pretties for You by Alice Cooper was released on June 30.
 The Stooges, the debut studio album from The Stooges, was released on August 5.  The album was ranked at No. 185 on Rolling Stone list of the "500 Greatest Albums of All Time". The album included the single, "I Wanna Be Your Dog" which was ranked at No. 438 on Rolling Stone'''s list of the 500 Greatest Songs of All Time.
 My Cherie Amour by Stevie Wonder was released on August 29. It featured the hit songs, "My Cherie Amour (pop No. 4) and "Yester-Me, Yester-You, Yesterday" (pop No. 7, R&B No. 5).
 Puzzle People by The Temptations was released on September 23 and reached No. 5 on the pop albums chart. It featured the No. 1 single "I Can't Get Next to You".
 Cream of the Crop, the final regular album by The Supremes to feature Diana Ross, was released on November 3. The album featured "Someday We'll Be Together", the final No. 1 hit of the 1960s. 
 Four in Blue by The Miracles was released on November 3 and reached No. 3 in the R&B albums chart.
 Diana Ross Presents The Jackson 5 by The Jackson 5 was released on December 18 and reached No. 5 on the pop albums chart and No. 1 on the R&B albums chart. Recorded at Motown's Hitsville U.S.A. studio in Detroit, the album featured the No. 1 hit single, "I Want You Back".
 Grand Funk, the second studio album by Grand Funk Railroad, was released on December 29 and reached No. 11 on the pop albums chart.

Chronology of events
January

February

March

April

May

June

July

August

September

October

November

December

Births
 January 1 - Verne Troyer, actor (Mini-Me in the Austin Powers film series), in Sturgis, Michigan
 March 18 - Mike Dumas, NFL safety (1991-2000), in Grand Rapids, Michigan
 April 19 - Dana Nessel, 54th Attorney General of Michigan
 June 6 - Erik Prince, former U.S. Navy SEAL officer and founder and former CEO and chairman of the government services and security company Blackwater USA, now known as Academi, in Holland, Michigan
 October 8 - Jeremy Davies, actor (Saving Private Ryan, Lost, Justified''), in Traverse City, Michigan
 October 23 - Sanjay Gupta, neurosurgeon and CNN's Emmy Award-winning chief medical correspondent, in Novi, Michigan

Gallery of 1969 births

Deaths
 January 28 - Jesse P. Wolcott, U.S. Congressman (1931–1957), at age 75
 April 10 - Alvin Morell Bentley, U.S. Congressman (1953-1961), at age 50 in Tucson, Arizona
 May 5 - Eddie Cicotte, Major League Baseball pitcher (1905-1920) banned from baseball due to the Black Sox scandal, at age 84 in Livonia, Michigan
 June 27 - Allen James Babcock, Bishop of Grand Rapids (1954-1969), at age 71
 October 6 - Walter Hagen, golfer with 11 professional majors championships, at age 76 in Traverse City, Michigan

Gallery of 1969 deaths

See also
 History of Michigan
 History of Detroit

References